Pūre parish is an administrative unit of Tukums Municipality in the Courland region of Latvia. The administrative center is Pūre.

Towns, villages and settlements of Pūre parish 
 Daigone
 Dzintars
 Lamiņi
 Meiniķi
 Pūre
 Vildene

See also 
 Lamiņi Manor

References

External links

Parishes of Latvia
Tukums Municipality
Courland